The Oriani class (also known as the Poeti class), were a group of four destroyers built for the  (Royal Italian Navy) in the mid-1930s. They were improved versions of the s and had increased machinery power and a different anti-aircraft armament. The increase in power, however, disappointed in that there was only a marginal speed improvement. The obsolete 40 mm/39 pom-pom anti-aircraft guns were finally discontinued, being replaced by extra  machine guns; otherwise armament was unchanged.

Modifications  
Significant upgrades were made to the weapons systems of the two ships that survived Matapan, similar to those made to the Maestrales. One torpedo tube mounting was replaced by two /54 guns;  cannon, a 120 mm star-shell gun and depth charge throwers were also installed. Before the end of the war, one ship, Oriani had a German Seetakt radar and an additional 20 mm cannon.

Ships
All four ships were built by O.T.O. Livorno and named after poets:

Notes

Bibliography

External links 

 Page from Uboat.net
 Classe Oriani Marina Militare website

 
Destroyer classes
Destroyers of the Regia Marina
Ship classes of the French Navy